Manuel "Flaco" Ibáñez Martínez (born 17 October 1946) is a Mexican actor and comedian who has appeared in over 140 films and television shows in Mexico.

Biography 
Manuel Ibáñez Martínez was born on 17 October 1946, the youngest of four children and the only male child in his family. His father was a day laborer who separated from the family shortly after his son was born. Because his mother had no career of her own, Ibáñez had to assist his family economically from a young age. His mother's brother, Domingo, assisted the family and provided Ibáñez with a much needed father figure during childhood.

After the death of his mother in 1968, Ibáñez started working as a photojournalist in a news agency that had been created by some of his friends. He was sent to cover the student movement of that year, but soon realized that he wanted to be a performer instead.

He enrolled under the Faculty of Philosophy and Literature at the National Autonomous University of Mexico (UNAM), and after competing in an oral poetry competition won a scholarship to study acting at the National Institute of Fine Arts and Literature in Mexico City.

Ibáñez has become one of the icons of Mexican comedy, thanks to his roles in such films as Llegamos, los fregamos y nos fuimos, Los peseros, Los plomeros y las ficheras, El rey de las ficheras, La chica del alacrán de oro, and Lagunilla mi barrio. He has worked with many well known actors, such as Carmen Salinas, Luis de Alba, Alfonso Zayas, Andrés García, Isela Vega, Rafael Inclán, Mario Almada, Sasha Montenegro and Agustín Bernal.

Women have been a major factor in his life, as evidenced by his five marriages. The first, when he was 24 years of age, gave him his first child, Miranda, but quickly ended in divorce. His current wife is Jacqueline Castro, with whom he has had two daughters, Tanya and Daniel. He is also the father of actress Daniela Ibañez.

Ibáñez teaches acting as part of the Centro de Capacitación Artística (CEA) ("Artistic Training Center") of the media company Televisa. He made his television writing debut on the 2005 sitcom Vecinos ("Neighbours"), produced by Eugenio Derbez, in which he also appeared in a recurring acting role. In 2006, Ibáñez moved to Argentina for a major role in the telenovela-sitcom Amor mío ("My Love"), starring Raúl Araiza and Vanessa Guzmán, eventually appearing in 112 episodes over two seasons.

For his work in movies and television Ibanez was inducted into the Paseo de las Luminarias in 1995.

Filmography

Television

Film and video

Awards and nominations

Premios TVyNovelas

Kids Choice Awards México

References

External links 
 

1946 births
Living people
Male actors from Oaxaca
Mexican male comedians
Mexican male telenovela actors
Mexican male film actors